Mattia Chiesa (born 16 July 2000) is an Italian footballer who plays as a goalkeeper for  club Mantova on loan from Hellas Verona.

Club career
He started his senior career with the Serie D club Ambrosiana.

On 4 July 2018, he joined Hellas Verona on loan with an option to purchase. In the 2018–19 season, he mostly played for the club's Under-19 squad, and also served as a back-up on the senior squad on multiple occasions in Serie B games.

On 26 July 2019, he was loaned by Hellas Verona to Serie C club Virtus Verona. He made his professional Serie C debut for Virtus Verona on 3 November 2019 in a game against Piacenza. He started the game and played the full match. On 3 September 2020, the loan was renewed for the 2020–21 season. He remained a back-up throughout 2020–21.

On 19 July 2021, he joined Trento, newly promoted into Serie C, on loan. On 8 January 2022, Verona terminated the loan.

On 30 January 2023, Chiesa moved on loan to Mantova.

References

External links
 

2000 births
Living people
People from Rovereto
Sportspeople from Trentino
Footballers from Trentino-Alto Adige/Südtirol
Italian footballers
Association football goalkeepers
Serie C players
Serie D players
Hellas Verona F.C. players
Virtus Verona players
A.C. Trento 1921 players
Mantova 1911 players